Brendan Reilly may refer to:
 Brendan Reilly (athlete), British high jumper
 Brendan Reilly (politician), vice mayor of Chicago
 Brendan Reilly (Meath Gaelic footballer), Irish Gaelic footballer
 Brendan Reilly (Louth Gaelic footballer), Irish Gaelic footballer